The individual jumping at the 1956 Summer Olympics took place on 17 June, at the Stockholm Olympic Stadium. The event was open to men and women. It was the 10th appearance of the event.

Competition format
The team and individual jumping competitions used the same results. The course had 13 obstacles. The time limit was 1 minute, 56.1 seconds. Penalty points were received for obstacle faults (3, 4, 6, or 8 points based on severity) or exceeding the time limit (0.25 points per second or fraction thereof over the limit). A third refusal or jumping an obstacle out of order resulted in elimination. Scores from the two runs were added together for a total score. The three individual scores were summed to give a team score.

Results
20 teams of 3 (60 riders) competed. Only half of the teams had all 3 riders complete both runs of the course.

References

Equestrian at the 1956 Summer Olympics